Challis Walker Calandria (November 18, 1912February 12, 2000) was an American sculptor and painter.

Biography
Challis Walker, born in New York City. Calandria was educated in New York City. At the age of twelve she had her first instruction in sculpture (outside of school) which caused her decision to enter art school after graduating from the Chapin School.

In juried shows she received many honors from the museums of New Orleans.

References

1912 births
2000 deaths
20th-century American sculptors
20th-century American women artists
Académie Colarossi alumni
American women sculptors
artists from New York City
Chapin School (Manhattan) alumni
sculptors from New York (state)